Juan Sebastián Cabal and Robert Farah were defending champions, but lost to Martin Kližan and Philipp Oswald in the semifinals.
Kližan and Oswald went on to win the title, defeating Pablo Andújar and Oliver Marach in the final, 7–6(7–3), 6–4.

Seeds

Draw

Draw

References
 Main Draw

Rio Open - Men's Doubles
Rio
Rio Open